The Soviet Union (USSR) was the host nation of the 1980 Summer Olympics in Moscow. 489 competitors, 340 men and 149 women, took part in 202 events in 23 sports.

The Soviet Union won a record 80 gold medals (although since surpassed by the United States), and their 195 total medals are the second best result in history.

Medalists
The USSR finished first in the final medal rankings, with 80 gold and 195 total medals.

Competitors

Archery

Men

Women

Athletics

Men's competition
Men's 100 metres
Aleksandr Aksinin
 Heat — 10.26
 Quarterfinals — 10.29
 Semifinals — 10.45
 Final — 10.42 (→ 4th place)

Vladimir Muravyov
 Heat — 10.37
 Quarterfinals — 10.34
 Semifinals — 10.42
 Final — 10.44 (→ 6th place)

Andrei Shlyapnikov
 Heat — 10.43
 Quarterfinals — 10.59 (→ did not advance)

Men's 200 metres
Nikolay Sidorov
 Heat — 21.15
 Quarterfinals — 20.83
 Semifinals — 21.17 (→ did not advance)

 Vladimir Muravyov
 Heat — did not start (→ did not advance)

 Aleksandr Stasevich
 Heat — did not finish (→ did not advance)

Men's 400 metres
Viktor Markin
 Heat — 46.88
 Quarterfinals — 45.58
 Semifinals — 45.60
 Final — 44.60 (→  Gold medal)

Viktor Burakov
 Heat — 46.41
 Quarterfinals — 46.23
 Semifinals — 45.97 (→ did not advance)

Nikolay Chernetsky
 Heat — 47.04
 Quarterfinals — 46.30
 Semifinals — 45.94 (→ did not advance)

Men's 800 metres
Nikolay Kirov
 Heat — 1:47.5
 Semifinals — 1:46.7
 Final — 1:46.0 (→  Bronze medal)

Anatoliy Reshetnyak
 Heat — 1:47.9
 Semifinals — 1:48.2 (→ did not advance)

Men's 1,500 metres
Vladimir Malozemlin
 Heat — 3:38.7
 Semifinals — 3:43.6 (→ did not advance)

Vitaliy Tyshchenko
 Heat — 3:44.4
 Semifinals — 3:41.5 (→ did not advance)

Pavel Yakovlev
 Heat — 3:44.2 (→ did not advance)

Men's 5,000 metres
 Aleksandr Fyodotkin
 Heat — 13:45.6
 Semifinals — 13:31.9
 Final — 13:24.1 (→ 8th place)

 Valery Abramov
 Heat — 13:42.9
 Semifinals — 13:40.7 (→ did not advance)

 Enn Sellik
 Heat — 13:52.4 (→ did not advance)

Men's 10,000 metres
 Enn Sellik
 Heat — 29:12.1
 Final — 28:13.8 (→ 8th place)

 Vladimir Shesterov
 Heat — 29:32.4 (→ did not advance)

 Aleksandras Antipovas
 Heat — did not finish (→ did not advance)

Men's 4x100 metres relay
 Vladimir Muravyov, Nikolay Sidorov, Aleksandr Aksinin and Andrey Prokofyev
 Heat — 38.68
 Final — 38.26 (→  Gold medal)

Men's 4x400 metres relay
 Nikolay Chernetskiy, Mikhail Linge, Remigijus Valiulis and Viktor Burakov
 Heat — 3:01.8
 Remigijus Valiulis, Mikhail Linge, Nikolay Chernetskiy and Viktor Markin
 Final — 3:01.1 (→  Gold medal)

Men's 110 m hurdles
 Aleksandr Puchkov
 Heat — 13.84
 Semifinals — 13.50
 Final — 13.44 (→  Bronze medal)

 Andrey Prokofyev
 Heat — 13.61
 Semifinals — 13.59
 Final — 13.49 (→ 4th place)

 Yuriy Chervanev
 Heat — 13.75
 Semifinals — 13.78
 Final — 15.80 (→ 8th place)

Men's 400 m hurdles
 Vasyl Arkhypenko
 Heat — 50.22
 Semifinals — 49.80
 Final — 48.86 (→  Silver medal)

 Nikolay Vasilyev
 Heat — 50.09
 Semifinals — 49.87
 Final — 49.34 (→ 4th place)

 Aleksandr Kharlov
 Heat — 50.79
 Semifinals — 50.64 (→ did not advance)

Men's 3,000 m steeplechase
 Anatoliy Dimov
 Heat — 8:33.2
 Semifinals — 8:24.9
 Final — 8:19.8 (→ 8th place)

 Serhiy Olizarenko
 Heat — 8:34.3
 Semifinals — did not finish (→ did not advance)

 Aleksandr Vorobey
 Heat — 8:42.6
 Semifinals — 8:44.3 (→ did not advance)

Men's marathon
 Setymkul Dzhumanazarov
 Final — 2:11:35 (→  Bronze medal)

 Vladimir Kotov
 Final — 2:12:05 (→ 4th place)

 Leonid Moseyev
 Final — 2:12:14 (→ 5th place)

Men's 20 km walk
Pyotr Pochenchuk
 Final — 1:24:45.4 (→  Silver medal)

Yevgeniy Yevsyukov
 Final — 1:26:28.3 (→ 4th place)

Anatoliy Solomin
 Final — DSQ (→ no ranking)

Men's 50 km walk
Yevgeniy Ivchenko
 Final — 3:56:32 (→  Bronze medal)

Vyacheslav Fursov
 Final — 3:58:32 (→ 5th place)

Boris Yakovlev
 Final — DSQ (→ no ranking)

Men's long jump
 Valeriy Podluzhniy
 Qualification — 8.02 m
 Final — 8.18 m (→  Bronze medal)

 Viktor Belskiy
 Qualification — 8.01 m
 Final — 8.10 m (→ 6th place)

Men's high jump
 Aleksandr Grigoryev
 Qualification — 2.21 m
 Final — 2.21 m (→ 8th place)

 Gennadiy Belkov
 Qualification — 2.21 m
 Final — 2.21 m (→ 10th place)

 Aleksey Demyanyuk
 Qualification — 2.21 m
 Final — 2.21 m (→ 11th place)

Men's pole vault
 Konstantin Volkov
 Qualification — 5.35 m
 Final — 5.65 m (→  Silver medal)

 Sergey Kulibaba
 Qualification — 5.35 m
 Final — 5.45 m (→ 8th place)

 Yury Prokhorenko
 Qualification — no mark (→ did not advance)

Men's triple jump
Jaak Uudmäe
 Qualification — 16.69 m
 Final — 17.35 m (→  Gold medal)

Viktor Saneyev
 Qualification — 16.57 m
 Final — 17.24 m (→  Silver medal)

Yevgeni Anikin
 Qualification — 16.77 m
 Final — 16.12 m (→ 9th place)

Men's hammer throw
Yuriy Sedykh
 Qualification — 78.22 m
 Final Round — 81.80 m (→  Gold medal)

Sergey Litvinov
 Qualification — 75.24 m
 Final Round — 80.64 m (→  Silver medal)

Jüri Tamm
 Qualification — 76.24 m
 Final Round — 78.96 m (→  Bronze medal)

Men's discus throw
 Viktor Rashchupkin
 Qualification — 64.78 m
 Final — 66.64 m (→  Gold medal)

 Yuriy Dumchev
 Qualification — 62.82 m
 Final — 65.58 m (→ 5th place)

 Ihor Duhinets
 Qualification — 63.10 m
 Final — 64.04 m (→ 6th place)

Men's shot put
 Vladimir Kiselyov
 Qualification — 20.72 m
 Final — 21.35 m (→  Gold medal)

 Aleksandr Baryshnikov
 Qualification — 20.58 m
 Final — 21.08 m (→  Silver medal)

 Anatoli Yarosh
 Qualification — 20.19 m
 Final — 19.93 m (→ 9th place)

Men's javelin throw
 Dainis Kula
 Qualification — 85.76 m
 Final — 91.20 m (→  Gold medal)

 Aleksandr Makarov
 Qualification — 83.32 m
 Final — 89.64 m (→  Silver medal)

 Heino Puuste
 Qualification — 82.96 m
 Final — 86.10 m (→ 4th place)

Men's decathlon
 Yuriy Kutsenko
 Final — 8331 points (→  Silver medal)

 Sergei Zhelanov
 Final — 8135 points (→  Bronze medal)

 Valeri Kachanov
 Final — did not finish (→ no ranking)

Women's competition

Women's 100 metres
 Lyudmila Kondratyeva
 Heat — 11.13
 Quarterfinals — 11.06
 Semifinals — 11.11
 Final — 11.06 (→  Gold medal)

 Vera Anisimova
 Heat — 11.53
 Quarterfinals — 11.33
 Semifinals — 11.51 (→ did not advance)

 Natalya Bochina
 Heat — 11.38
 Quarterfinals — 11.30
 Semifinals — 11.38 (→ did not advance)

Women's 200 metres
 Natalya Bochina
 Heat — 23.28
 Quarterfinals — 22.26
 Semifinals — 22.75
 Final — 22.19 (→  Silver medal)

 Lyudmila Maslakova
 Heat — 23.49
 Quarterfinals — 23.24
 Semifinals — 23.27 (→ did not advance)

Women's 400 metres
 Irina Nazarova
 Heat — 51.66
 Semifinals — 50.18
 Final — 50.07 (→ 4th place)

 Nina Ziuskova
 Heat — 51.42
 Semifinals — 51.12
 Final — 50.17 (→ 5th place)

 Lyudmila Chernova
 Heat — 51.51
 Semifinals — 51.30 (→ did not advance)

Women's 800 metres
 Nadiya Olizarenko
 Heat — 1:59.3
 Semifinals — 1:57.7
 Final — 1:53.5 (→  Gold medal)

 Olga Mineyeva
 Heat — 2:01.5
 Semifinals — 1:57.5
 Final — 1:54.9 (→  Silver medal)

 Tatyana Providokhina
 Heat — 1:58.5
 Semifinals — 1:58.3
 Final — 1:55.5 (→  Bronze medal)

Women's 1,500 metres
 Tatyana Kazankina
 Heat — 3:59.2
 Final — 3:56.6 (→  Gold medal)

 Nadiya Olizarenko
 Heat — 3:59.5
 Final — 3:59.6 (→   Bronze medal)

 Lyubov Smolka
 Heat — 4:04.4
 Final — 4:01.3 (→ 6th place)

Women's 100 m hurdles
 Vera Komisova
 Heat — 12.67
 Semifinal — 12.78
 Final — 12.56 (→  Gold medal)

 Irina Litovchenko
 Heat — 12.97
 Semifinal — 12.84
 Final — 12.84 (→ 6th place)

 Tatyana Anisimova
 Heat — 13.31
 Semifinal — did not start (→ did not advance)

Women's 4x100 metres relay
 Vera Komisova, Lyudmila Maslakova, Vera Anisimova and Natalya Bochina
 Final — 42.10 (→  Silver medal)

Women's 4x400 metres relay
 Tatyana Prorochenko, Tatyana Goyshchik, Lyudmila Chernova and Olga Mineyeva
 Heat — 3:25.3
 Tatyana Prorochenko, Tatyana Goyshchik, Nina Ziuskova and Irina Nazarova
 Final — 3:20.2 (→  Gold medal)

Women's high jump
 Marina Sysoeva
 Qualification — 1.88 m
 Final — 1.91 m (→ 5th place)

 Tamara Bykova
 Qualification — 1.88 m
 Final — 1.88 m (→ 9th place)

 Marina Serkova
 Qualification — 1.80 m (→ did not advance)

Women's long jump
 Tatyana Kolpakova
 Qualification — 6.70 m
 Final — 7.06 m (→  Gold medal)

 Tetyana Skachko
 Qualification — 6.56 m
 Final — 7.01 m (→  Bronze medal)

 Lidiya Alfeyeva
 Qualification — 6.78 m
 Final — 6.71 m (→ 8th place)

Women's discus throw
 Tatyana Lesovaya
 Qualification — 62.20 m
 Final — 67.40 m (→  Bronze medal)

 Galina Murašova
 Qualification — 60.32 m
 Final — 63.84 m (→ 7th place)

 Faina Melnik
 Qualification — 53.76 m (→ did not advance)

Women's javelin throw
 Saida Gunba
 Qualification — 63.98 m
 Final — 67.76 m (→  Silver medal)

 Tatyana Biryulina
 Qualification — 59.86 m
 Final — 65.08 m (→ 6th place)

 Yadviga Putiniene
 Qualification — 62.96 m
 Final — 59.94 m (→ 11th place)

Women's shot put
 Svetlana Krachevskaia
 Final — 21.42 m (→  Silver medal)

 Nunu Abashidze
 Final — 21.15 m (→ 4th place)

 Natalya Akhrimenko
 Final — 19.74 m (→ 7th place)

Women's pentathlon
 Nadiya Tkachenko — 5083 points (→  Gold medal)
 100 metres — 13.29s
 Shot put — 16.84m
 High jump — 1.84m
 Long jump — 6.73m
 800 metres — 2:05.20
 Olga Rukavishnikova — 4937 points (→  Silver medal)
 100 metres — 13.66s
 Shot put — 14.09m
 High jump — 1.88m
 Long jump — 6.79m
 800 metres — 2:04.80
 Olga Kuragina — 4875 points (→  Bronze medal)
 100 metres — 13.26s
 Shot put — 12.49m
 High jump — 1.84m
 Long jump — 6.77m
 800 metres — 2:03.60

Basketball

Summary

Men's roster
 Stanislav Yeryomin
 Valery Miloserdov
 Sergei Tarakanov
 Aleksandr Salnikov
 Andrey Lopatov
 Nikolay Deryugin
 Sergei Belov
 Vladimir Tkachenko
 Anatoly Myshkin
 Sergejus Jovaiša
 Alexander Belostenny
 Vladimir Zhigily

Women's roster
 Angelė Rupšienė
 Lyubov Sharmay
 Vida Beselienė
 Olga Korostelyova
 Tatyana Ovechkina
 Nadezhda Olkhova
 Uljana Semjonova
 Lyudmila Rogozhina
 Nelli Feryabnikova
 Olga Sukharnova
 Tetiana Nadyrova
 Tatyana Ivinskaya

Boxing

Canoeing

Men

Women

Cycling

Thirteen cyclists represented the Soviet Union in 1980.

Road

Track
Pursuit

Sprint

Time trial

Diving

Men

Women

Equestrian

Dressage, Individual
 Yuriy Kovshov →  Silver medal
 Viktor Ugryumov →  Bronze medal
 Vera Misevich → 4th place

Team dressage
 Yuriy Kovshov, Viktor Ugryumov, Vera Misevich →  Gold medal

Three-Day Event, Individual
 Aleksandr Blinov →  Silver medal
 Yuri Salnikov →  Bronze medal
 Valery Volkov → 4th place
 Sergey Rogozhin → 11th place

Three-Day Event, Team
 Aleksandr Blinov, Yuri Salnikov, Valery Volkov, Sergey Rogozhin  →  Gold medal

Jumping, Individual
 Nikolai Korolkov →  Silver medal
 Viktor Poganovsky → 5th place
 Vyacheslav Chukanov → 9th place

Jumping, Team
 Nikolai Korolkov, Viktor Poganovsky, Vyacheslav Chukanov, Viktor Asmaev  →  Gold medal

Fencing

18 fencers, 13 men and 5 women, represented Soviet Union in 1980.

Men's foil
 Volodymyr Smyrnov →  Gold medal
 Aleksandr Romankov →  Bronze medal
 Sabirzhan Ruziyev → 4th place

Men's team foil
 Aleksandr Romankov, Volodymyr Smyrnov, Sabirzhan Ruziyev, Ashot Karagyan, Vladimir Lapitsky →  Silver medal

Men's épée
 Aleksandr Mozhayev → 5th place
 Boris Lukomsky → 7th place
 Aleksandr Abushakhmetov → 9th place

Men's team épée
 Ashot Karagyan, Aleksandr Abushakhmetov, Aleksandr Mozhayev, Boris Lukomsky, Volodymyr Smyrnov →  Bronze medal

Men's sabre
 Viktor Krovopuskov →  Gold medal
 Mikhail Burtsev →  Silver medal
 Vladimir Nazlymov →  8th place

Men's team sabre
 Viktor Sidyak, Vladimir Nazlymov, Viktor Krovopuskov, Mikhail Burtsev, Nikolai Alyokhin →  Gold medal

Women's foil
 Nailya Gilyazova → 9th place
 Yelena Novikova-Belova → 9th place
 Valentina Sidorova → 13th place

Women's team foil
 Valentina Sidorova, Nailya Gilyazova, Yelena Novikova-Belova, Irina Ushakova, Larisa Tsagarayeva →  Silver medal

Field hockey

Summary

Men's roster
 Vladimir Pleshakov
 Vyacheslav Lampeyev
 Leonid Pavlovski
 Sos Hayrapetyan
 Farit Zigangirov
 Valeri Belyakov
 Sergei Klevtsov
 Oleg Zagorodnev
 Aleksandr Gusev
 Sergei Pleshakov
 Mikhail Nichepurenko
 Minneula Azizov
 Aleksandr Sychyov
 Aleksandr Myasnikov
 Viktor Deputatov
 Aleksandr Goncharov

Women's roster
 Galina Inzhuvatova
 Nelli Gorbatkova
 Valentina Zazdravnykh
 Nadezhda Ovechkina
 Natella Krasnikova
 Natalia Bykova
 Lidiya Glubokova
 Galina Vyuzhanina
 Natalia Buzunova
 Leyla Akhmerova
 Nadezhda Filippova
 Yelena Guryeva
 Tatyana Yembakhtova
 Tatyana Shvyganova
 Alina Kham
 Lyudmila Frolova

Football

Summary

Team roster
 Rinat Dasayev
 Tengiz Sulakvelidze
 Aleksandre Chivadze
 Vagiz Khidiyatullin
 Oleg Romantsev
 Sergey Shavlo
 Sergey Andreyev
 Volodymyr Bezsonov
 Yuri Gavrilov
 Fyodor Cherenkov
 Valery Gazzaev
 Vladimir Pilguy
 Sergei Baltacha
 Sergei Nikulin
 Khoren Oganesian
 Aleksandr Prokopenko
 Revaz Chelebadze

Gymnastics

Men

Women

Handball

Summary

Men's roster
 Mykhaylo Ishchenko
 Mykola Tomyn
 Aleksandr Anpilogov
 Vladimir Belov
 Yevgeni Chernyshov
 Anatoli Fedyukin
 Aleksandr Karshakevich
 Yury Kidyayev
 Vladimir Kravtsov
 Serhiy Kushniryuk
 Viktor Makhorin
 Voldemaras Novickis
 Vladimir Repyev
 Aleksey Zhuk

Women's roster
 Nataliya Tymoshkina
 Larysa Karlova
 Tetyana Kocherhina
 Valentyna Lutayeva
 Aldona Nenėnienė
 Lyubov Odynokova
 Iryna Palchykova
 Zinaida Turchyna
 Lyudmila Poradnyk
 Yuliya Safina
 Sigita Strečen
 Olha Zubaryeva
 Larisa Savkina
 Natalya Lukyanenko

Judo

Extra lightweight (60 kg)
Aramby Yemizh →   Bronze medal

Half lightweight (65 kg)
Nikolai Solodukhin →   Gold medal

Lightweight (71 kg)
Tamaz Namgalauri →  12th place

Half middleweight (78 kg)
Shota Khabareli →   Gold medal

Middleweight (86 kg)
Aleksandrs Jackēvičs →   Bronze medal

Half heavyweight (95 kg)
Tengiz Khubuluri →   Silver medal

Heavyweight (+95 kg)
Vitaly Kuznetsov →  10th place

Open category
Sergey Novikov →  5 place

Modern pentathlon

Rowing

The Soviet Union had 30 male and 24 female rowers participate in all 14 rowing events in 1980.

Men

Women

Sailing

Shooting

Open

Swimming

Men

Women

Volleyball

Summary

Men's roster
 Yury Panchenko
 Vyacheslav Zaytsev
 Aleksandr Savin
 Vladimir Dorokhov
 Aleksandr Yermilov
 Valeriy Kryvov
 Pāvels Seļivanovs
 Oleg Moliboga
 Vladimir Kondra
 Vladimir Chernyshov
 Fedir Lashchonov
 Viljar Loor

Women's roster
 Nadezhda Radzevich
 Nataliya Razumova
 Olga Solovova
 Yelena Akhaminova
 Larisa Pavlova
 Yelena Andreyuk
 Irina Makogonova
 Lyubov Kozyreva
 Svetlana Nikishina
 Lyudmila Chernyshyova
 Svetlana Badulina
 Lidiya Loginova

Water polo

Summary

Team roster
 Evgeni Sharonov
 Sergei Kotenko
 Vladimir Akimov
 Yevgeny Grishin
 Mait Riisman
 Aleksandr Kabanov
 Aleksei Barkalov
 Erkin Shagaev
 Georgi Mshvenieradze
 Mikhail Ivanov
 Viacheslav Sobchenko

Weightlifting

Wrestling

References

Nations at the 1980 Summer Olympics
1980
Summer Olympics